Nesodynerus is a genus of potter wasps endemic to the Hawaiian archipielago. This genus is surprisingly large (103 species) for the small territory it covers. The genera Chelodynerus and Pseudopterocheilus are presently treated as synonyms of Nesodynerus.

Species
Nesodynerus contains the following species:

References

 Carpenter, J. M. 2008. Review of the Hawaiian Vespidae (Hymenoptera). Bishop Museum Occasional Papers 99: 1–18.

Biological pest control wasps
Potter wasps
Taxa named by Robert Cyril Layton Perkins